Tomáš Michálek (born 27 November 1977) is a Czech footballer (midfielder) currently playing for Bohemians 1905.

References
 
 
 Profile at FC Zbrojovka Brno official site 

1977 births
Living people
Czech footballers
Czech expatriate footballers
FK Jablonec players
Malatyaspor footballers
Wisła Płock players
FC Zbrojovka Brno players
Bohemians 1905 players
Association football midfielders
Expatriate footballers in Poland
Expatriate footballers in Turkey
Czech expatriate sportspeople in Poland
Czech expatriate sportspeople in Turkey
Czech First League players
Süper Lig players